Khojaly Genocide Memorial may refer to:

 Khojaly Genocide Memorial (Baku)
 Khojaly Genocide Memorial (Berlin)
 Khojaly Genocide Memorial (The Hague)